Alafia River Corridor Nature Preserve is a 4,700 acre area of protected lands in Hillsborough County, Florida. There are two trailheads for the preserves's hiking trails, one located at the north boundary of the Pinecrest Sports Complex on Hwy. 39 approximately one mile north of Hwy. 640  and one located on Hwy. 39 just north of Jameson Rd. 

This nature preserve is managed by Hillsborough County's Conservation and Environmental Lands Management Department. The area helps protect a portion of the Alafia River, a tributary of Tampa Bay, and its floodplain. In addition to hiking, horseback riding, fishing, a picnic area, geocache stashes, and camping are provided for in the park.

See also
Fish Hawk Creek Preserve
Southwest Florida Water Management District
Florida state forests
List of Florida state parks

References

Protected areas of Hillsborough County, Florida
Southwest Florida Water Management District reserves